Fargo is an unincorporated community in Oak Grove Township, Benton County, in the U.S. state of Indiana.

Geography

References

Unincorporated communities in Indiana
Unincorporated communities in Benton County, Indiana